Thomas Wong Doo (1903–18 June 1963) was a New Zealand merchant, interpreter and community leader. He was born in Canton, China in 1903.

References

1903 births
1963 deaths
Interpreters
Chinese emigrants to New Zealand
20th-century translators